Mayflower Photoplay Company was a small independent company that produced a dozen films over three years, from 1919 to 1922. It was based in Boston.

The company worked with filmmakers George Loane Tucker, Allan Dwan , Émile Chautard and Raoul Walsh. Mayflower Photoplay Company made some films for Columbia Films run by Joseph P. Kennedy.

Filmography
Living Lies (1922)  
Ladies Must Live (1921)  
The Sin of Martha Queed (1921) 
The Oath (1921)(I)  
Unseen Forces (1920)  
In the Heart of a Fool (1920)  
The Law of the Yukon (1920)  
The Scoffer (1920)   (An Allan Dwan Production)
A Splendid Hazard (1920)  
The Deep Purple (1920)  
The Luck of the Irish (1920)  
Soldiers of Fortune (1919)  
The Mystery of the Yellow Room (1919) 
The Miracle Man (1919)
Bolshevism on Trial (1919)

References

Mass media companies established in 1919
Mass media companies disestablished in 1922
Defunct American film studios
1919 establishments in Massachusetts
1922 disestablishments in Massachusetts
American companies disestablished in 1922
American companies established in 1919